Acta Psychologica is a peer-reviewed open access academic journal. Effective 1 January 2021, it became fully open access. It publishes articles in six different sections: cognition, social psychology, clinical and health psychology, language psychology, individual differences, and lifespan development. The journal was established in 1935 and is published ten times per year by Elsevier. According to the Journal Citation Reports, it has a 2020 impact factor of 1.734.

References

External links

Experimental psychology journals
Elsevier academic journals
Publications established in 1935
English-language journals
10 times per year journals
Creative Commons Attribution-licensed journals